Yul-Woo Lee (January 25, 1967 – December 10, 2009) was a South Korean former professional boxer who competed from 1985 to 1990. He was a world champion in two weight classes, having held the WBC light-flyweight title in 1989 and the WBA flyweight title in 1990.

Professional career
Lee turned pro in 1985 and captured the WBC light flyweight title with a TKO win over German Torres in 1989. He lost his belt in his first defense to Humberto González. He then moved up in weight and won a split decision over WBA flyweight title holder Jesus Kiki Rojas in 1990, but lost the belt in his first defense again to Leopard Tamakuma by TKO. He retired after the loss.

Professional boxing record

See also 

List of light-flyweight boxing champions
List of flyweight boxing champions

External links 
 

1967 births
2009 deaths
Light-flyweight boxers
World light-flyweight boxing champions
Flyweight boxers
World flyweight boxing champions
World Boxing Association champions
World Boxing Council champions
South Korean male boxers